Jason Mantzoukas (born December 18, 1972) is an American actor, comedian, writer and podcaster. He is best known for his recurring role as Rafi in the FX comedy series The League, and as one of the three co-hosts of the podcast How Did This Get Made? alongside Paul Scheer and June Diane Raphael.

After beginning his career as an improv comedian, he has played several comedic roles in film and television. He appeared in the films The Dictator, The Long Dumb Road, Sleeping with Other People, They Came Together, Conception, and John Wick: Chapter 3 – Parabellum. He has had recurring roles on three TV series created by Michael Schur: Parks and Recreation (as Dennis Feinstein), Brooklyn Nine-Nine (as Adrian Pimento), and The Good Place (as Derek Hofstetler). He voices the characters Jay Bilzerian in the Netflix animated series Big Mouth, Alex Dorpenberger in the HBO Max animated series Close Enough, Rex Splode in the Amazon Prime animated action series Invincible, and Jankom Pog in the Paramount+ animated series Star Trek: Prodigy.

Early life and education
Mantzoukas was born in Nahant, Massachusetts, and is the eldest child of Cynthia (née Mourousas) and William Mantzoukas, second-generation Greek-Americans. He has one younger sister, Melissa. He has described himself as "100 percent Greek."

Mantzoukas began taking drum lessons at age 10 and studied under Steve Barrett for over 8 years. In interviews, he has cited Stewart Copeland, Stephen Perkins from Jane's Addiction, and Jimmy Chamberlin from The Smashing Pumpkins as his biggest influences as a young musician. He participated in jazz and marching bands in high school, as well as playing in a cover band called Slygoul. He continued with jazz drumming in college and also played for a bebop group.

Mantzoukas attended Swampscott High School, graduating in 1991. While attending, he was named captain of Swampscott's boys' soccer and track teams and was also president of the marching band. He then attended Middlebury College in Middlebury, Vermont, where he majored in religion. He attempted to defend a "terribly written" honors thesis on religious iconography (which he admits to starting a week prior to his defense date) but was not given credit to graduate with honors.

After graduating college in 1995, Mantzoukas was granted a Watson Fellowship and traveled throughout North Africa and the Middle East studying religious and transcendental music for nearly two years. He has admitted to having a "horrible [grant proposal] but was charming in the room; so [he earned the grant]." At the time he left for Morocco for the Watson Fellowship, he had already had six auditions and callbacks for the Blue Man Group, but he ultimately decided to travel before the audition process was complete. He lived in Morocco for about 7½ months while studying and recording Gnawa music. While abroad, he also traveled to Egypt, Israel, Turkey, Jordan, and Syria. During his time abroad, he was arrested numerous times, once in Morocco for having an expired tourist visa and again in Turkey to prevent him from traveling through an active war zone.

Career

Early comedy
Mantzoukas first began writing comedy sketches during his junior and senior years of high school for variety shows. He began performing short-form improvisational comedy (improv) as a part of the Otter Nonsense Players at Middlebury College and quickly became "obsessed" with improv as it used the same skill set as performing jazz. While performing with the Otters, Mantzoukas met and began learning and practicing long-form improv with fellow performers, Jessica St. Clair, Dan O'Brien, and Rodney Rothman.

Upright Citizens Brigade
Soon after moving to New York City in 1998, he began performing comedy regularly at the Upright Citizens Brigade Theater (UCB) and was taught by Amy Poehler. He was a member of the improv team "Mother," one of the UCB's earliest house teams. During his time at UCB, Mantzoukas worked in the computer graphics department at J.P. Morgan for over three years to "make ends meet."

Mantzoukas and comedian Ed Herbstman performed as the comedy duo, "The Mantzoukas Brothers," for a number of years and were named the "Best Improv Duo" by Time Out New York magazine in 2006. Mantzoukas continued to write and perform as a duo with Jessica St. Clair appearing in the sketch show, "We Used to Go Out" and long-form improv show, "First Date." Together, he and St. Clair pitched a pilot to HBO (which was ultimately not picked up) and also earned a deal with Comedy Central. The two were often compared to the likes of Nichols and May and continue to collaborate and perform on the podcast, Womp It Up!. Mantzoukas would later go on to teach advanced improv classes at UCB.

Television and film
Mantzoukas has appeared in movies such as Baby Mama, I Hate Valentine's Day, The Dictator, and John Wick: Chapter 3 – Parabellum, and starred in The Long Dumb Road. Mantzoukas has a main role in the Paramount+ comedy series No Activity, and has had recurring roles on The League as Rafi, Enlightened, Kroll Show, Parks and Recreation, Comedy Bang! Bang!, Transparent, Brooklyn Nine-Nine, I'm Sorry, and The Good Place.

Mantzoukas has done extensive voice acting work, including main roles on the animated series Big Mouth, Close Enough, HouseBroken, and Star Trek: Prodigy. In 2018, he replaced T.J. Miller as the voice of Mr. Mucus for the Mucinex commercials.
In 2022, he was cast as Dionysus/Mr. D in the Disney+ adaptation of the book series Percy Jackson & the Olympians.

Writing career
In 2008, NBC ordered a pilot for a comedy series written by Mantzoukas called Off Duty. The pilot was filmed in New York starring Bradley Whitford and Romany Malco but the series was not picked up. In interviews in 2014, Mantzoukas announced that he was working on a "loosely autobiographical" television show for Showtime about life after ending a long-term relationship.

Mantzoukas earned credit for writing the screenplay draft of the buddy cop comedy Ride Along, starring Ice Cube and Kevin Hart. He originally was asked to write for Andy Samberg as one of the leads, but the rights to the film were ultimately purchased by Universal Studios who later cast Hart in the role originally intended for Samberg. He has also served as a consulting writer and producer on Childrens Hospital and Portlandia.

Podcasts
He currently co-hosts the podcast How Did This Get Made? with Paul Scheer and June Diane Raphael. Mantzoukas also regularly makes appearances on Comedy Bang! Bang!, Womp It Up!, and Reply All.

Personal life
Mantzoukas was born with an egg allergy and experiences anaphylaxis if ingested. He has cited this allergy as the cause of his hypochondriac tendencies.

He was previously in a relationship with actress Connie Britton.

Filmography

Film

Television

Video games

Podcast and radio appearances
In addition to hosting How Did This Get Made?, Mantzoukas also has been a guest on a number of podcasts.

References

External links

 

1972 births
20th-century American comedians
20th-century American male actors
21st-century American comedians
21st-century American male actors
American male comedians
American male film actors
American male television actors
American male voice actors
Television producers from Massachusetts
American television writers
American podcasters
American writers of Greek descent
Comedians from Massachusetts
Living people
Male actors from Massachusetts
American male television writers
Middlebury College alumni
People from Nahant, Massachusetts
Screenwriters from Massachusetts
Upright Citizens Brigade Theater performers
Watson Fellows